Quitus is a genus of grasshoppers in the subfamily Romaleinae; described by Hebard in 1924.

Species

Quitus insolens Hebard, 1924 - type species
Quitus podocarpus Amédégnato & Poulain, 1994
Quitus zurucucho Amédégnato & Poulain, 1994

Caelifera genera
Romaleidae